Sven Dodlek (born 28 September 1995) is a Croatian football midfielder who plays for Austrian side SV Tillmitsch. Born in Slovenia, he has opted to represent Croatia internationally.

Personal life
His older brother, Timotej Dodlek, is also a footballer.

References

External links
Player profile at NZS 

1995 births
Living people
Sportspeople from Maribor
Association football midfielders
Slovenian footballers
Slovenia youth international footballers
Croatian footballers
Croatia youth international footballers
NK Maribor players
NK Rudar Velenje players
NK Ankaran players
NK Drava Ptuj (2004) players
Slovenian PrvaLiga players
Slovenian Second League players
Austrian Landesliga players
Austrian Regionalliga players
Croatian expatriate footballers
Expatriate footballers in Austria
Croatian expatriate sportspeople in Austria